Browntown may refer to any of several places in the United States:

Browntown, New Jersey, an unincorporated community
Browntown, Bradford County, Pennsylvania, an unincorporated community
Browntown, Luzerne County, Pennsylvania, a census-designated place
Browntown, South Carolina, a census-designated place
Browntown, Albemarle County, Virginia, an unincorporated community
Browntown, Wisconsin, a village

See also

Brown's Town, Saint-Ann, Middlesex, Jamaica
Brownton, McLeod, Minnesota, USA
Brownstown (disambiguation)
Brown (disambiguation)
Town (disambiguation)